Liang Weikeng (born 30 November 2000) is a Chinese badminton player. He was part of the Chinese junior squad that won gold medals in the 2018 World Junior Championships in Markham and the Asia Junior Championships in Jakarta. He won his first World Tour title at the 2022 Japan Open with Wang Chang.

Career 
Liang partnered with Shang Yichen and won a bronze medal at the 2018 BWF World Junior Championships in the men's doubles event. He also won a silver medal with Shang at the 2018 Badminton Asia Junior Championships after losing to compatriots Di Zijian and Wang Chang in the final.

After a long hiatus, he partnered with Wang Chang and advanced to the final of the 2022 Indonesia Masters from the qualifying rounds. They lost 10–21, 17–21 to home favorites Fajar Alfian and Muhammad Rian Ardianto in the final.

Less than three months later, they won the 2022 Japan Open, defeating Kim Astrup and Anders Skaarup Rasmussen in the final in three games.

Achievements

World Junior Championships 
Boys' doubles

Asian Junior Championships 
Boys' doubles

BWF World Tour (2 titles, 2 runners-up) 
The BWF World Tour, which was announced on 19 March 2017 and implemented in 2018, is a series of elite badminton tournaments sanctioned by the Badminton World Federation (BWF). The BWF World Tours are divided into levels of World Tour Finals, Super 1000, Super 750, Super 500, Super 300, and the BWF Tour Super 100.

Men's doubles

BWF International Challenge/Series (1 runner-up) 
Men's doubles

BWF Junior International (2 titles) 
Boys' doubles

  BWF Junior International Grand Prix tournament
  BWF Junior International Challenge tournament
  BWF Junior International Series tournament
  BWF Junior Future Series tournament

References

External links 
 

2000 births
Living people
Badminton players from Guangdong
Chinese male badminton players
21st-century Chinese people